Saku Saku Morning Call is a morning show on which PUFFY made several appearances throughout the late 1990s. It broadcast from 1997 to 2000 on TVK. Each episode would be like a "morning variety show".

External links
https://www.youtube.com/watch?v=nhWormFqtvw

1997 Japanese television series debuts
2000 Japanese television series endings